The 2022 FIS Alpine Ski Australia-New Zealand Cup is the Australia-New Zealand Cup season, the second international level competition in alpine skiing.

Men

Calendar

Rankings

Overall

Slalom

Super-G

Giant slalom

Women

Calendar

Rankings

Overall

Slalom

Super-G

Giant slalom

References 

2022 in alpine skiing
2023 in alpine skiing